Die Abenteuer eines Zehnmarkscheines (K. 13513), also known as Adventures of a Ten Mark Note and Uneasy Money, is a German silent film directed by Berthold Viertel. It was released in 1926. This film is considered lost.

Cast
 Mary Nolan 
 Oskar Homolka
 Werner Fuetterer
 Maly Delschaft
 Francesco von Mendelssohn

External links
 

1926 films
Films of the Weimar Republic
German silent feature films
Films set in Berlin
Films shot in Berlin
Lost German films
German black-and-white films
Films directed by Berthold Viertel